Kudryashovo, also known as Kudryashov, (Kudriaşov, كۋدرياشوۆ; , Kudryashovo) is a town in Atyrau Region, west Kazakhstan.

References

Atyrau Region
Cities and towns in Kazakhstan